Russell Gordon Fraser (born March 1, 1934) was a Canadian politician. He served in the Legislative Assembly of British Columbia from 1983 to 1991, as a Social Credit member for the constituency of Vancouver South.

He served as Attorney General of British Columbia from 1990 to 1991. After Premier Bill Vander Zalm's resignation in 1991, he was considered for interim leader of the party (and thus premier), but lost the caucus vote to Rita Johnston by 21–17.

References 

1934 births
British Columbia Social Credit Party MLAs
Canadian engineers
Living people
Politicians from Vancouver
Attorneys General of British Columbia
Members of the Executive Council of British Columbia
Solicitors general of Canadian provinces